Phantom Studios (formerly Phantom Films) is an Indian film production and distribution company established by Anurag Kashyap, director Vikramaditya Motwane, producer Madhu Mantena and the former head of UTV Spotboy, Vikas Bahl. It was founded in 2011 by all four of them, and is cited as the "directors' company". In March 2015, Reliance Entertainment picked up 50% stake in the company.

The company’s first production was the period romance Lootera (2013), directed by Motwane and starring Ranveer Singh and Sonakshi Sinha. the film was co-produced by Balaji Motion Pictures. Next year, the company co-produced the romantic-comedies Hasee Toh Phasee and Queen, starring Kangana Ranaut. Both the films were critical and commercial successes, with the latter also winning the National Film Award for Best Feature Film in Hindi. It was followed by the thrillers Ugly and NH10 (2015). The latter marked the production debut of Anushka Sharma. Hunterrr (2015), Bombay Velvet (2015) and Masaan (2015) were the company's next releases.

Establishment
Phantom Films was founded in 2011 by Anurag Kashyap, Vikramaditya Motwane, Vikas Bahl and Madhu Mantena, and is cited as the "directors' company". The idea to start their own production house came in mind of because of "their failure in convincing every time to someone to believe in the kind of cinema they make". In March 2015, Reliance Entertainment picked up 50% stake in the company.

Films
The company's first film was the period romance Lootera (2013), starring Ranveer Singh and Sonakshi Sinha. Based O. Henry's short story, The Last Leaf,  the film was critically acclaimed.

Phantom film's then went on to collaborate with Karan Johar's Dharma Productions to produce the romantic comedy Hasee Toh Phasee (2014). The film starring Parineeti Chopra and Sidharth Malhotra was directed by the debutant Vinil Mathew. It was followed by Vikas Bahl-directed comedy drama Queen, starring Kangana Ranaut. The film was a critical and commercial success, it also won the National Film Award for Best Feature Film in Hindi. Ugly (2014), a drama thriller was the next production venture of Phantom.

In 2015, the company produced Anushka Sharma's production debut film NH10, and the coming of age comedy Hunterrr. Both films proved to be a success. Bombay Velvet, a period film set in Bombay in the 1960s, based on Princeton University Historian Gyan Prakash's book Mumbai Fables, was its next release. It stars Ranbir Kapoor, Anushka Sharma and Karan Johar. The film was a major box-office failure. Masaan, was phantom's fourth release of the year. The film won the FIPRESCI Award and the Promising Future award at the 2015 Cannes Film Festival. The string of box-office failures for Phantom Films continued with Shaandaar (2015), starring Alia Bhatt and Shahid Kapoor.

In February 2016, Phantom Films announced that they will co-produce three Gujarati films with CineMan Productions, a Gujarat-based film production company co-founded by Abhishek Jain.
Phantom's first release of the year was Udta Punjab (2016), a crime drama from the director Abhishek Chaubey that documents the substance abuse endemic in the Indian state of Punjab. The film generated controversy when the Central Board of Film Certification demanded extensive censorship before its theatrical release, citing that the portrayal of Punjab in it was negative. After the producers of the film filed lawsuit against the board, the Bombay High Court cleared the film for exhibition with a single scene cut. It was followed by Raman Raghav 2.0, a thriller directed by Anurag Kashyap based on the notorious serial killer Raman Raghav, starring Nawazuddin Siddiqui in the title character. The film premiered at the 2016 Sydney Film Festival and the 2016 Cannes Film Festival, in the Director's Fortnight section to positive response. The company's final release of the year was the Gujarati film Wrong Side Raju. Their last film was  83 in 2021.

Dissolution

The company announced its dissolution on 5 October 2018, largely in response to the sexual assault allegation on Bahl by a former Phantom employee, which was reported in 2015.  The other three founders, Kashyap, Motwane, and Mantena, all issued statements on Twitter confirming the company's disbanding and moving on to independent projects.

Revival
Following the dissolution, in January 2021, Mantena and Sheetal Talwar bought out Bahl, Kashyap and Motwane's stakes in Phantom to become equal shareholders in the company with Reliance Entertainment. However, shortly before the release of 83, they sold their shares back to Reliance, making it the sole shareholder of Phantom, and left the company.

In March 2022, in a reversal of the sale of their shares, Mantena and Talwar acquired the Phantom brand as well as its film and television library and some film properties from Reliance. The company was then renamed to Phantom Studios, with one of its first projects being a Hindi-language remake of the 2022 Tamil film Love Today co-produced with AGS Entertainment.

Filmography

Films produced

Films distributed

Series

Awards

 62nd National Film Awards: Best Feature Film in Hindi: Queen
 63rd National Film Awards: Indira Gandhi Award for Best Debut Film of a Director: Masaan
 64th National Film Awards: Best Feature Film in Gujarati: Wrong Side Raju

References

External links
 Official website

Hindi cinema
Film production companies based in Mumbai
Defunct film and television production companies
Producers who won the Best Debut Feature Film of a Director National Film Award
Anurag Kashyap